Aiolopus simulatrix  is a species of locust belonging to the family Acrididae, subfamily Oedipodinae.

References

Oedipodinae
Acrididae
Insects_described_in_1870
Insect pests of millets